The Asturcón is an ancient breed of small horse or pony from the autonomous region of Asturias in northern Spain. It has been documented since Roman times: it has an unusual ambling gait, which was described by Pliny the Elder in his Naturalis Historia. It is of Celtic type, and shows similarity to the Pottok and Losino of Spain, the Garrano of Portugal, and the Dartmoor, Exmoor, Fell, Highland, Shetland and Welsh breeds of the British Isles.

History 

The Asturcón has been known and described since Roman times; it is mentioned in an epigram of Martial, and by Pliny the Elder in his Naturalis Historia, where he describes its characteristic ambling gait. The Latin word asturco was later used for other similar small horses with ambling gait.

At about the time of the Spanish Civil War, the population of the Asturcón separated into two distinct parts, one in the sierras of Sueve and La Vita, and the other further to the west, in the sierras of El Palo,  and Tineo. The two populations are genetically distinct.

At the end of 2003, there were 1181 head registered, in the hands of 94 breeders. In 2007 the Asturcón was listed by the FAO as "endangered-maintained". 

The Asturcón is thought to have given rise to the extinct Irish Hobby, and has been used in attempts to re-create that breed.

Characteristics 

The only coat colour admitted for registration in the stud-book is black; a small frontal star is allowed. There is a small population of bay Asturian horses of Celtic type, but they are not registered in the Asturcón stud-book.

References

Horse breeds
Asturias
Horse breeds originating in Spain